Blowin' Your Mind! is the debut studio album by Northern Irish musician Van Morrison, released in 1967. It was recorded 28–29 March 1967 and contained his first solo pop hit "Brown Eyed Girl".  It was included by Rolling Stone as one of the 40 Essential Albums of 1967.

Recording and release history 
Morrison does not regard this record as a true album, as Bert Berns compiled and released it without his consent. A few months previously, Morrison had carelessly signed a contract that he had not fully studied and it stipulated that he would surrender virtually all control of the material he would record with Bang Records. The songs were recorded in March 1967 and had been intended to be released on four separate singles. The album jacket became notorious as a model of bad taste, a perception shared widely by Morrison himself. It featured a strange swirl of circling brown vines (and drug connotation) surrounding a sweaty looking Morrison. Greil Marcus described it as a "monstrously offensive, super psychedelic far out out-of-sight exploding" design. Morrison's then-wife, Janet Planet, said "He never has been, never will be anything approaching a psychedelic user – wants nothing to do with it, wants nothing to do with any drug of any kind". As the singer recalls, "I got a call saying it was an album coming out and this is the cover. And I saw the cover and I almost threw up, you know." Later, after Berns' death, Morrison would express his displeasure on a couple of "nonsense songs"  he included on the contractual obligation recording session.  One was titled "Blow in Your Nose," and another was titled "Nose in Your Blow."

Songs and reviews 
Of the eight songs on the album, all were composed by Morrison except "Goodbye Baby (Baby Goodbye)" and the last song, "Midnight Special". Clinton Heylin contends that the first side of the album "makes for one of the great single-sided albums in rock", whereas Greil Marcus, the album's most hostile critic, found it "painfully boring, made up of three sweet minutes of 'Brown Eyed Girl'  and... the sprawling, sensation-dulling 'T.B. Sheets'". "He Ain't Give You None"  is an urban tale of "lust, jealousy and sexual disgust." It references Notting Hill Gate and Curzon Street in London, England, places Morrison would have been familiar with when he lived there during his earlier touring days. It contains the words, "You can leave now if you don't like what is happening." Brian Hinton compares "the delighted contempt of the singer, the song's graveyard pace, the stately organ and stinging guitar"  to the Highway 61 period of Bob Dylan.

Reception 
Allmusic gave the album a 3-star rating and wrote that "Although Van Morrison's first solo album is remembered for containing the immortal pop hit "Brown Eyed Girl," Blowin' Your Mind! is actually a dry run for his masterpiece, Astral Weeks."

Track listing

Personnel 

Musicians 
 Van Morrison - vocals, guitar, harmonica on "T.B. Sheets"
 Eric Gale, Al Gorgoni, Hugh McCracken - guitars
 Russ Savakus - bass
 Paul Griffin - piano
 Garry Sherman - organ
 The Sweet Inspirations - backing vocals on "Brown Eyed Girl" and "Midnight Special"
 Gary Chester - drums

Production 
 Vic Anesini – mastering
 Brooks Arthur – engineer
 Bert Berns – arranger, director, producer, liner notes
 Adam Block – project director
 Bob Irwin – liner notes, reissue producer
 John Jackson – project director
 Garry Sherman – actual arranger, conductor, musical supervisor
Rodriguez of Los Angeles - cover photography

Charts

Album 
Billboard

Singles 
Billboard

References

Sources 
 Heylin, Clinton (2003). Can You Feel the Silence? Van Morrison: A New Biography, Chicago Review Press 
 Hinton, Brian (1997). Celtic Crossroads: The Art of Van Morrison,  Sanctuary, 
 Rogan, Johnny (2006). Van Morrison: No Surrender, London:Vintage Books

External  
 WFMU'S: Beware of the Blog Morrison's Contractual Obligation Album

Van Morrison albums
1967 debut albums
Albums produced by Bert Berns
Epic Records albums
Legacy Recordings albums
Bang Records albums
Unauthorized albums